Ruth L. Schwartz (born 1962 Geneva, New York) is an American poet. Her most recent poetry collection is Dear Good Naked Morning (Autumn House Press, 2005). She graduated from Wesleyan University, with a B.A., from the University of Michigan, with an M.F.A., from the University of Integrative Learning with a Ph.D. in Transpersonal Psychology.  The San Francisco Bay Area has been Ruth's chosen home since 1985; she has also traveled extensively in Latin America, and speaks fluent Spanish.

She has taught at Cleveland State University, Goddard College, Mills College, California State University-Fresno, California College of the Arts. She teaches at Ashland University, and offers workshops and one-on-one mentoring on the theme of The Writer As Shaman nationwide. She lives in Oakland, California.

Awards
 NEA Fellowship
 Ohio Arts Council Fellowship
 Astraea Foundation Fellowship
 two Nimrod/Neruda awards
 2000 Chelsea Magazine Editor's awards
 a Reader's Choice award from Prairie Schooner
 New Letters Literary Award
 Randall Jarrell Award from the North Carolina Writer's Network
 Sue Saniel Elkin award from Kalliope Magazine
 AWP award
 2000 Anhinga Prize for Poetry
 2001 National Poetry Series, for Edgewater
 2005 Autumn House Press Prize for Dear Good Naked Morning

Published works
Full-Length Poetry Collections
 
 
 
 
 

Anthology Publications

References

External links
 "Author's website"
 The Writer as Shaman
 ""Ruth Schwartz", The Writer's Almanac
 "Fetch"; "Important Thing"; "In India", Poetry Magazine
 "Can Pigeons be Heros?", The Marlboro Review
 "Tangerine", Poetry Foundation
 "To Look and Look and Look", Ruth L. Schwartz interviewed by Stacey Waite, March 2003
 "Gravity", Kalliope, a journal of women's art and literature

1962 births
Living people
Wesleyan University alumni
University of Michigan alumni
National Endowment for the Arts Fellows
Poets from New York (state)
Cleveland State University faculty
Goddard College faculty
Mills College faculty
California State University, Fresno faculty
California College of the Arts faculty
Ashland University faculty
People from Geneva, New York
American women poets
21st-century American poets
American women academics
21st-century American women writers